The men's 81 kilograms (Half middleweight) competition at the 2002 Asian Games in Busan was held on 1 October at the Gudeok Gymnasium.

Schedule
All times are Korea Standard Time (UTC+09:00)

Results

Main bracket

Repechage

References
2002 Asian Games Report, Page 459

External links
Official website

M81
Judo at the Asian Games Men's Half Middleweight